100 días para enamorarse is a Chilean telenovela written by Rodrigo Bastidas, from a screenplay by Sebastián Ortega. The series is based on the 2018 Argentine telenovela of the same name produced by Viacom International Studios and broadcast on Telefe. It stars María Elena Swett, Marcelo Alonso, Luz Valdivieso, Diego Muñoz, Fernando Larraín, and Celine Reymond, and it premiered on 9 December 2019, replacing the telenovela Juegos de poder.

Premise 
The series revolves around Laura (María Elena Swett) and Antonia (Luz Valdivieso), two great friends who make a pact with their husbands to separate for 100 days, at which time they must follow 10 strict rules and in the end decide if they want to continue together or not. The idea is to show how men and women see life in different ways.

Cast 
 María Elena Swett as Laura Domínguez
 Diego Muñoz as Pedro Valdés
 Luz Valdivieso as Antonia Salinas
 Marcelo Alonso as Diego Prieto
Celine Reymond as Mané Valenzuela
 Sebastián Layseca as Kike Martinez
 Claudia Pérez as Florencia González
 Fernando Larraín as Javier Muñoz
 Felipe Rojas as Pablo Domínguez
 Teresita Commentz as Martina Salinas/Martín Salinas
 Clemente Rodríguez as Clemente Valdés
 Andrea Eltit as Carmen Mujica
 Santiago Díaz as Lucas Valdés
 Valentina Alvear as Julieta Muñoz
 Simón Acuña as Nicolás Muñoz
Amalia Kassai as Cristina Vicuña
 César Sepúlveda as Andrés García
Schlomit Baytelman as Lourdes Cotapos
Gabriel Prieto as Leo Salinas
Jacqueline Boudon as Raquel Soto
Catherine Mazoyer as Magdalena Alvear
María José Bello as Catalina Mardones
Juan Pablo Sáez as Sebastian Ruiz
Carolina Paulsen as Alicia, Manu's mother
Paulo Brunetti as Laura y Pedro's therapist
Muriel Martin as Tamara Galindo
Daniela Muñoz as Manu
Sebastián Arrigorriaga as Joaquín
Bárbara Ríos as Solange
Daniel Guillón as Laura's tinder date
Cristián Alegría as Man in nightclub
Daniel Elosúa as Man in nightclub
María José Quiroz as María José Quintana
Mayte Sarmiento as Sole
Iñaki Larraín as Borja
Catalina Vera as Esther
Julio César Serrano as Bombero, Javier's friend
Romeo Singer as Arturo

References

External links 
 

Chilean telenovelas
Mega (Chilean TV channel) telenovelas
Spanish-language telenovelas
2019 telenovelas
2019 Chilean television series debuts
2021 Chilean television series endings